Cyperus rohlfsii is a species of sedge that is native to eastern Africa.

The species was first formally described by the botanist Johann Otto Boeckeler in 1882.

See also 
 List of Cyperus species

References 

rohlfsii
Taxa named by Johann Otto Boeckeler
Plants described in 1882
Flora of Ethiopia
Flora of Eritrea
Flora of Somalia
Flora of Kenya
Flora of Uganda
Flora of Tanzania